Châtillon is a commune in the southwestern suburbs of Paris, France.

The town was formerly named Châtillon-sous-Bagneux, and a relic of this denomination remains in at least one road sign in Vanves (located at the junction Boulevard du Lycée and Avenue Charles de Gaulle, and written as Châtillon s/ B).

The TGV trains are maintained at the "Établissement Industriel de
Maintenance du TGV de Châtillon" (EIM TGV de Châtillon).

History
The name of the town is first documented in 1192 in the archives of St-Martin-des-Champs Priory in Medieval Latin as "Castellio" ("little castle"). It is not known where this castle was located. Two possible locations are the heights of Châtillon (to the southwest) or in the former market town on the manor.  This manor was owned by the Abbey of Saint-Germain-des-Prés until 1600, when it was sold to Richard Tardieu. The small town grew slowly. During the 14th century a chapel dedicated to a Saint Eutropius was built and a parish established. In addition to agriculture, the exploitation of a rock quarry provided an economic basis for the town.

In 1417, during the Armagnac–Burgundian Civil War, John the Fearless, Duke of Burgundy, camped at Châtillon for eight days while his army pillaged the surrounding villages before laying siege to Montlhéry.

From 1790 to 1795 Châtillon was a canton of the district of Bourg-de-l'Égalité.

In 1815 the British, who had crossed the Seine at Sèvres, occupied the heights of Châtillon and pillaged the village. The Tour des Anglais, located in southwest part of the town, was built on the ruins of a former tower that was part of the fortifications of the area, and was later used as a windmill. During that year a quick and lively engagement with enemy English and Prussian troops took place near the tower.

During the Siege of Paris, Châtillon was the site of two battles: the First Battle of Châtillon (17–19 September 1870) as the Prussian army invested Paris, and the Second Battle of Châtillon (13 October 1870), in which the II Bavarian Corps was driven from Châtillon, although ultimately the French were forced to retire in face of Prussian artillery.

Population

Adjacent communes
 Bagneux
 Clamart
 Fontenay-aux-Roses
 Malakoff
 Montrouge

Transport
Châtillon is served by Châtillon – Montrouge station on Paris Métro Line 13.

Châtillon enjoys a well connected bus service: from Paris, the 68 comes all the way from the Place de Clichy to the metro station. Buses 194, 195 and 295 all leave Porte d'Orléans and pass by the Châtillon – Montrouge metro station from where they continue mostly in different directions. The 162 running east and west of Châtillon can take you to the RER station in Meudon, or the shopping centre to the east. The 394 which passes by the market is ideal for Clamart, Vanves, and Issy-les-Moulineaux. If you need to get to Issy from the metro, then take the 126.

Twin towns – sister cities
Châtillon is twinned with:
 Aywaille, Belgium
 Genzano di Roma, Italy
 Merseburg, Germany

See also
Communes of the Hauts-de-Seine department

References

External links

 Official website 
 Châtillon town council website 

 
Communes of Hauts-de-Seine